Oripää Airfield is an airfield in Oripää, Finland,  northeast of Oripää municipal centre. It hosted World Glider Aerobatic Championships in 2013.

See also
List of airports in Finland

References

External links
 
 Turun Lentokerho ry – Oripää Airfield (official site)
 VFR Suomi/Finland – Oripää Airfield
 Lentopaikat.net – Oripää Airfield 

Airports in Finland
Airfield
Buildings and structures in Southwest Finland